Janet Chandler (December 31, 1911 – March 16, 1994) was a model and actress in American films. She had starring roles in several films of the 1930s. She was born Lillian Guenther in Pine Bluff, Arkansas. She began her film career as a child actress.

Born Lillian Elizabeth Guenther in Pine Bluff, Arkansas to Albert John and Janet Elizabeth (Williams) Guenther, Chandler was a leading lady in the films The Golden West and Cowboy Holiday. After her family moved to Los Angeles, California, young Lillian attended girls schools (Harter, Orton). 

Chandler married twice and had three daughters. On October 21, 1935, she married George Edward Barrett, a New York investment broker. They divorced in 1947. She married, secondly, to playwright Joseph Kramm in 1956. That union also ended in divorce.

Chandler died at UCLA Medical Center in Los Angeles, California on March 19, 1994, aged 82, of heart failure and was interred in Bellwood Cemetery in her native Pine Bluff, Arkansas.

Selected filmography
The Three Musketeers (1921 film) (uncredited)
Inez from Hollywood (1924) as  Ruth Sullivan - Child (not billed)
The Golden West (1932)
Cowboy Holiday (1934) as Ruth Hopkins
Cyclone of the Saddle (1935) as Sue 
The Drunkard (1935)
Now or Never (1935)
 Million Dollar Haul (1935)
Rough Riding Ranger (1935) as Dorothy White  
Now or Never (1935) as Audrey Ferry
Cyclone of the Saddle (1935) as Sue 
Show Girls
The Drunkard (1935) as Mary Wilson

References

1911 births
1994 deaths
People from Pine Bluff, Arkansas
Actresses from Arkansas
20th-century American actresses